Priority Pass is a program owned by Collinson Group that provides members with access to airport lounges around the world, including allowing holders to visit lounges with economy class or premium economy class tickets. The company was founded in 1992 and claims to be the largest network of airport lounges in the world.

The company sells three classes of memberships directly from its website, including Standard, Standard Plus, and Prestige, which each provide different levels of access. A fourth class of membership, Select, is included with certain credit cards.

The program started adding services at airports other than lounges in 2017, such as airport hotels, bars and restaurants.

References

Airport lounges
Credit card rewards programs